The 1962 Scottish League Cup final was played on 27 October 1962 at Hampden Park in Glasgow and it was the final of the 17th Scottish League Cup competition. The final was contested by Kilmarnock and Heart of Midlothian. Hearts won the match 1–0, with the only goal scored by Norrie Davidson.

Match details

References

External links
 Soccerbase
 London Hearts

1962
League Cup Final
Heart of Midlothian F.C. matches
Kilmarnock F.C. matches
1960s in Glasgow
October 1962 sports events in the United Kingdom